Flavio Romero de Velasco assumed office as Governor of the State of Jalisco on 1 March 1977, and his term ended on 28 February 1983. The governor has the authority to nominate members of his Cabinet of the State of Jalisco, as per the Ley Orgánica del Poder Ejecutivo del Estado de Jalisco, Article 4, Section V.

Cabinet

Cabinet officials on 1 March 1977

References 

State governments of Mexico
Cabinets established in 1977
Cabinets disestablished in 1983